Tontilla taas is the debut solo studio album by Finnish musician Nopsajalka. Released in October 2006, the album peaked at number 32 on the Finnish Albums Chart.

Track listing

Charts

Release history

References

2006 debut albums
Nopsajalka albums
Finnish-language albums